Oulophyllia is a genus of stony corals in the family Merulinidae. Members of this genus are native to the tropical western and central Indo-Pacific region.

Characteristics
The colonies of these corals are massive and form dome-shaped mounds, similar to Favites, but the corallites are arranged in valleys with broad ridges between them.

Species 
The following species are currently recognized by the World Register of Marine Species :

Oulophyllia bennettae  (Veron, Pichon & Best, 1977)
Oulophyllia crispa  (Lamarck, 1816)
Oulophyllia levis  (Nemenzo, 1959)

References 

Merulinidae
Scleractinia genera